"January February" is a song by Scottish singer Barbara Dickson released on 25 January 1980 by Epic Records. It peaked at #11 on the UK Singles Chart the week ending 12 April 1980, spending 10 weeks on the chart. It also made the Top 20 in the German and South African charts and 64 in Australia.

The song signalled a new direction in her career, moving into the mainstream pop genre. It was written and produced by Alan Tarney who had recently resurrected Cliff Richard's career with his 1979 no.1 hit "We Don't Talk Anymore". Guitar on the song was played by Issac Guillory who also appeared on the music video and helped promote the song on TV.

Mary Roos recorded a German version of the single entitled "Wenn Ich Dich Nicht Halten Kann" ("If I Cannot Hold You").

References

1980 songs
1980 singles
Barbara Dickson songs
Songs written by Alan Tarney
Song recordings produced by Alan Tarney
Epic Records singles